Eastern philosophy in clinical psychology refers to the influence of Eastern philosophies on the practice of clinical psychology based on the idea that East and West are false dichotomies. Travel and trade along the Silk Road brought ancient texts and mind practices deep into the West.  Vedic psychology dates back  5000 years and forms the core of mental health counselling in the Ayurvedic medical tradition. The knowledge that enlightened Siddhartha Gautama was the self-management of mental suffering through mindfulness awareness practices. Humane interpersonal care of the mentally disturbed was practiced in the Middle East in the Middle Ages, and later in the West. Many of the founders of clinical psychology were influenced by these ancient texts as translations began to reach Europe during the 19th century.

Historical clinical psychologists 

The historical practice of clinical psychology may be distinguished from the modern profession of clinical psychology. The Greek word psyche means 'breath' or 'soul', while -logy (from logos, meaning 'speech') means 'study of'. Psyche was the Greek goddess of the soul. An early use of the word clinic was to describe 'one who receives baptism on a sick bed' (Webster 1913). In contemporary use it usually describes another kind of cleansing and rebirth – a non-hospital, healthcare facility for rehabilitation in the community.

Patanjali was one of the founders of the yoga tradition, sometime between 200 and 400 BC (pre-dating Buddhist psychology) and a student of the Vedas. He developed the science of breath and mind and wrote his knowledge in the form of between 194 and 196 aphorisms called the Yoga Sutras of Patanjali. These remain one of the only scientific books written in poetic form. He is reputed to have used yoga therapeutically for anxiety, depression and mental disorders as common then as now.

Padmasambhava was the 8th-century medicine Buddha of Tibet, called from the then Buddhist India to tame the Tibetans, and was instrumental in developing Tibetan psychiatric medicine. Tibetans were diplomats, counselors, traders, warriors and military tacticians in the Royal courts of East and West. Through these means they introduced arts of war and medicine to the west.

Rhazes was a Persian physician and scholar of the Middle Ages who had a profound effect on Western thought and medicine as well as the invention of alcohol and of sulfur drugs. He applied the psychology of self-esteem in clinical treatment of his patients (predating Nathaniel Branden by over a thousand years). He opened the first hospital ward for humane treatment of the mentally ill.

Avicenna's Canon of Medicine was a standard medical text in many European universities for 500 years. He performed psychotherapy without conversing, by observing the movement of a patient's pulse as the patient recounted broken hearted anguish, reported in 'The Life and Work of Jalaluddin Rumi' by Afzal Iqbal, A. J. Arberry, page 94. His treatises have touched most of the Muslim circle of the sciences.

Jalaluddin Rumi's view on psychotherapy was to embrace the dread, depression and anger as a blessing. Negative emotions were a bridge to a better life. This style of coping is illustrated in his guesthouse poem: 
This being human is a guesthouseevery morning a new arrival a joy, adepression, a meanness. Some momentaryawareness comes as an unexpectedvisitor. Welcome and entertain themall! Even if they're a crowd of sorrowswho violently sweep your house empty ofits furniture. Still treat each guesthonorably, He may be cleaning you out forsome new delight! The darkthought, the shame, the malice meet themat the door laughing and invite them in,be grateful for whoever comes becauseeach has been sent as a guide from thebeyond.

Sigmund Freud read the German translation of the works of Hayyim ben Joseph Vital (1542–1620). Vital was a 16th-century rabbi who had been Isaac Luria's student, the great master of the theosophical Kabbalah.  Freud read the French translation of the Zohar. He declared the material 'gold!' without acknowledging that source in his theories. His corpus was deeply influenced by his Jewish heritage and by the Jewish mysticism.
 
Carl Jung read the German translations by Richard Wilhelm of The Secret of the Golden Flower, the I Ching. He also read the Kabbalah and drew on its sources for development of his theory of the archetypes.

Martin Buber

Karen Horney studied Zen-Buddhism.

Fritz Perls studied Zen Buddhism. Typifying such a perspective, Perls once stated: We must lose our minds and come to our senses.

Erich Fromm collaborated with D. T. Suzuki in a 1957 workshop on "Zen Buddhism and Psychoanalysis"; wrote the foreword to a 1986 anthology of Nyanaponika Thera's essays.

Erik H. Erikson wrote a biography of Gandhi.

 
Viktor Frankl was the founder of Logotherapy. He wrote From Death Camp to Existentialism (1959) drawing on concentration camp experience and Jewish mysticism.

Abraham Maslow, an American-born Jew who struggled to make his way as a psychologist in an academic atmosphere which was not then ready to receive Jews. He believed his theories of motivation and self-actualization were, despite his avowed atheism, driven by a Jewish consciousness. The Transpersonal psychology that Maslow founded is a blend of Eastern and Western mystic traditions.

Stanislav Grof studied pre-industrial cosmologies including Egyptian and explored the significance of the posthumous journey of the soul in works such as Books of the Dead and The Human Encounter with Death.

Influential Western writers and translators 
Baruch Spinoza's legacy to psychology includes his holistic approach and determinism. He was alienated from his Jewish roots by excommunication and yet embedded in Jewish philosophy and mysticism, for example, 'The human mind cannot be absolutely destroyed with the body, but something of it remains, which is eternal. We feel and know by experience that we are eternal'. (Book V, Proposition 23). He distinguished between active emotions (those that are rationally understood) and passive emotions (those that are not). This predated Freud's popularization of the unconscious mind. His view, that emotions must be detached from external cause in order to master them, presages rational emotive therapy. His understanding of the workings of mind makes a bridge between religious mysticism and clinical psychology.

Arthur Schopenhauer was deeply influenced by the first  translations of Hindu and Buddhist texts to reach the west in the 19th Century. His philosophy and methods of inquiry have many similarities to those traditions. His ideas foreshadowed and laid the groundwork for Darwin's theory of evolution and Freud's concepts of libido and unconscious mind. He added empiricism to self-examination, which presaged Freud's interpersonal application in psychoanalysis.

 
Caroline Rhys Davids was a Pali scholar who translated original Pali texts in Buddhist Psychology. In 1914, she  wrote Buddhist Psychology: An Inquiry into the Analysis and Theory of Mind in Pali Literature. Her teacher in Psychology was George Croom Robertson, Scottish philosopher, editor of Mind from foundation in 1876 until 1891.

Richard Wilhelm was a translator of Chinese into German of the I Ching, Tao Te Ching and The Secret of the Golden Flower, with a foreword written by Jung, a close personal friend.

Idries Shah was an  author in the Naqshbandi sufist tradition who wrote works on psychology and spirituality. Defined Sufism in a way that predated Islam and did not depend on the Qur'an.

Coleman Barks has translated ecstatic poems of Rumi and other mystic poets of Persia.

Jack Kornfield trained as a Buddhist monk in India and Southeast Asia, holds a PhD in clinical psychology and co-founded the Insight Meditation Society and the Spirit Rock Meditation Center. His books include Seeking the Heart of Wisdom (1987, co-authored with Joseph Goldstein), A Path with Heart (1993) and The Art of Forgiveness, Lovingkindness and Peace (2002).

Daniel Goleman taught psychology at Harvard, wrote on science for The New York Times and is the author of the best-selling Emotional Intelligence (1995) and Destructive Emotions: A Scientific Dialogue with the Dalai Lama (Bantam Books, 2003).

Thomas Cleary was a prolific translator of Buddhist, Taoist, Confucian and Muslim religious literature. First publication with his brother of the Blue Cliff Record in 1992.

Contemporary clinicians 
Marsha M. Linehan incorporates mindfulness techniques (particularly Zen practices) in her Dialectical Behavioral Therapy (DBT) which has been found to be particularly effective with Cluster-B personality disorders.

Jon Kabat-Zinn incorporates Buddhist mindfulness techniques in his Mindfulness Based Stress Reduction (MBSR) program. Kabat-Zinn describes the program in his book Full Catastrophe Living.

Vidyamala Burch utilizes Buddhist mindfulness and metta practices in her Mindfulness-Based Pain Management (MBPM) programs, which are delivered through Breathworks.

Mark Epstein is the author of Thoughts Without a Thinker|Thoughts without a Thinker: Psychotherapy from a Buddhist Perspective (1995) and Going to Pieces Without Falling Apart (1998).

Mordechai Rotenberg has adopted the Kabbalistic-Hasidic tzimtzum paradigm, which he believes has significant implications for clinical therapy. According to this paradigm, God's "self-contraction" to vacate space for the world serves as a model for human behavior and interaction. The tzimtzum model promotes a unique community-centric approach which contrasts starkly with the language of Western psychology.

Techniques used in clinical settings 

 Vipassana - trains one to perceive the momentary arising and dissipating of all phenomena, nurturing the calm, detached recognition of all things' impermanence and interdependence.

See also 

 History of medicine
 History of philosophy
 Buddhism and psychology
 Research on meditation
 Eastern philosophy
 Egyptian philosophy
 Sufi philosophy
 Iranian philosophy
 Hasidic philosophy
 Psychology of religion
Mindfulness-based stress reduction
Mindfulness-based pain management
Mindfulness-based cognitive therapy

References

Further reading
 Sarunya Prasopchingchana & Dana Sugu, 'Distinctiveness of the Unseen Buddhist Identity' (International Journal of Humanistic Ideology, Cluj-Napoca, Romania, vol. 4, 2010)
 Abdullah, Somaya (Ph.D.) 'Multicultural social intervention and nation-building in South Africa: the role of Islamic counselling and psychotherapy.' Researcher and project leader at the Institute for Justice and Reconciliation.
 
 Damásio, António 2003. Looking for Spinoza: Joy, Sorrow, and the Feeling Brain, Harvest Books, 
 DeMartino, R.J. "Karen Horney, Daisetz T. Suzuki, and Zen Buddhism." Am J Psychoanal. 1991 Sep; 51(3):267-83.
 Drob, S. Freud and the Chasidim: Redeeming The Jewish Soul of Psychoanalysis. Jewish Review 3:1, 1989
 
 
 Erikson, Erik H. (1969). Gandhi's Truth: On the Origin of Militant Nonviolence. NY: W. W. Norton & Co. .
 Frankl, Victor. From Death Camp to Existentialism. Ilsa Lasch, trans. (Boston: Beacon Press, 1959)
 Fromm, Erich, D. T. Suzuki & Richard De Martino (1960). Zen Buddhism and Psychoanalysis. NY: Harper & Row. .
 Gay, P. A Godless Jew: Freud, Atheism and the Making of Psychoanalysis. New Haven: Yale University Press, 1987.
 
 Grof, S. (1994b). Books of the Dead. Thames and Hudson.
 Grof, S. and J. Halifax (1977). The Human Encounter with Death. E. P. Dutton.
 Kabat-Zinn, Jon (1990). Full Catastrophe Living: Using the Wisdom of Your Body and Mind to Face Stress, Pain, and Illness. NY: Dell Publishing. .
 Iqbal, Afzal & Arberry A. J. 'The Life and Work of Jalaluddin Rumi'
 Klein, D. Jewish Origins of the Psychoanalytic Movement. Chicago: University of Chicago Press,1985.
 Linehan, Marsha M. (1993a). Cognitive-Behavioral Treatment of Borderline Personality Disorder. NY: Guilford Press. .
 Linehan, Marsha M. (1993b). Skills Training Manual for Treating Borderline Personality Disorder. NY: Guilford Press. .
 
 Nyanaponika Thera, Bhikkhu Bodhi (ed.) & Erich Fromm (fwd.) (1986). Visions of Dhamma: Buddhist Writings of Nyanaponika Thera. York Beach, ME: Weiser Books. .
 Puhakka, Kaisa 'Transpersonal Knowing:  Exploring the horizon of consciousness' (SUNY 2000)
 Rhys Davids, C. A. F. 'A Buddhist manual of psychological ethics or Buddhist Psychology, of the Fourth Century B.C., being a translation, now made for the first time, from the Original Pāli of the First Book in the Abhidhamma-Piţaka, entitled Dhamma-Sangaṇi (Compendium of States or Phenomena) (1900). (Includes an original 80 page introduction.) Reprint currently available from Kessinger Publishing. .
 Seidner, Stanley S. (June 10, 2009) "A Trojan Horse: Logotherapeutic Transcendence and its Secular Implications for Theology". Mater Dei Institute. pp 10–12.
 
 
 Zokav, G. 'The Heart of the Soul: Emotional Awareness.' New York: N.Y.: fireside. 2001

External links 
 Psychology in Greek philosophy 640 BC to 180 CE
 Early history of psychology 354 CE to 1927

Neuroscience and Buddhism
Sarunya Prasopchingchana & Dana Sugu, 'Distinctiveness of the Unseen Buddhist Identity' ([1]International Journal of Humanistic Ideology, Cluj-Napoca, Romania, vol. 4, 2010)

Clinical psychology
Eastern philosophy
History of psychology
Mindfulness (psychology)
Psychology in the medieval Islamic world